This is a list of awards and nominations for Sonia Braga. Braga has been recognized with multiple awards and nominations for her work in film and television.

Awards and nominations

Film and television awards

BAFTA

Golden Globe Award

Gramado Film Festival

Cinema Brazil Grand Prize

Fenix Awards

Havana Film Festival

Mar del Plata International Film Festival

Lima Film Festival

Platino Awards

Primetime Emmy Awards

San Diego Film Critics Society Awards

Other prizes and nominations

Notes

References 

Braga, Sonia